Spiralisigna angusta is a moth in the family Geometridae. It is found in the United Arab Emirates.

References

Moths described in 2008
Eupitheciini